Baalshillem II was a Phoenician King of Sidon ( – ), the great-grandson of King Baalshillem I, and a vassal of the Achaemenid Empire. He succeeded Baana to the throne of Sidon, and was succeeded by his son Abdashtart I (in Greek, Straton).

Etymology 
The name Baalshillem (also Baalchillem) is the Latinized form of the Phoenician  (bʿlšlm), meaning "recompense of Baal". The king was known in contemporary Greek inscriptions as Sakton which can be interpreted as shipowner. Alternative spellings of the king's name include Baalchillem.

Chronology 
The absolute chronology of the kings of Sidon from the dynasty of Eshmunazar I onward has been much discussed in the literature; traditionally placed in the course of the fifth century, inscriptions of this dynasty have been dated back to an earlier period on the basis of numismatic, historical and archaeological evidence. The most complete work addressing the dates of the reigns of these Sidonian kings is by the French historian Josette Elayi who shifted away from the use of biblical chronology. Elayi used all the available documentation of the time and included inscribed Tyrian seals and stamps excavated by the Lebanese archaeologist Maurice Chehab in 1972 from Jal el-Bahr, a neighborhood in the north of Tyre, Phoenician inscriptions discovered by the French archaeologist Maurice Dunand in Sidon in 1965, and the systematic study of Sidonian coins, which were the first coins to bear minting dates representing the years of Sidonian kings' reigns.

Baalshillem II was the first among Sidonian monarchs to mark coins with issuing dates corresponding with the years of his reign as of year 30 which corresponds to 372 BC. Elayi established that Baalshillem II's year of accession was 401 BC and that he reigned until 366 BC. The dating of Baalshillem II's coins is of considerable importance to scholars, since the subsequent reigns are dated yearly until Alexander's conquest of the Levant in 333 BC; this helped scholars to establish the chronology of Sidonian kings in retrospect.

Historical context 

In 539 BC, Phoenicia fell under the Achaemenid rule; it was divided into four vassal kingdoms: Sidon, Tyre, Byblos and Arwad. Eshmunazar I, a priest of Astarte and the founder of his namesake dynasty was enthroned King of Sidon around the time of the Achaemenid conquest of the Levant.  During the first phase of Achaemenid rule Sidon flourished and reclaimed its former standing as Phoenicia's chief city. In the mid 5th century BC, Eshmunazar's dynasty was succeeded by that of Baalshillem I; this dynastic turnover coincides with the time by which Sidon began to independently mint its own coinage bearing the images of its reigning kings.

Epigraphic and numismatic sources 

The name of Baalshillem II is known from a votive statue of a "temple boy" offered to Eshmun, the Phoenician god of healing, by the king himself. The base of the Baalshillem temple boy statue bears a Phoenician inscription known as KAI 281; it reads:

The statue is of note because its inscription provides the names of four kings of Sidon from the Baalshillem I dynasty. The statue also represents the young future king Abdashtart I, who may have been five or six months of age at the time of the dedication of the statue.

Baalshillem II is also known from the coins he struck under his reign. The coins dating from the reign of the Baalshillem I dynasty show the abbreviated names of the respective kings, a custom of the Sidonian royalty. King Baalshillem I's name is abbreviated as B, Abdamon's name is abbreviated as ʿB, Bʿ stands for Baana. Baalshillem II adopted the same abbreviation as his namesake predecessor, he modified however the iconography of the coins. The obverse of Baalshillem II's coins depicts a Sidonian trireme, while the obverse of the coins of Baalshillem I showed a galley in front of Sidonian wall fortifications. The reverse of Baalshillem II's coins shows a ritual procession. Another differentiating characteristic is the minting dates that Baalshillem II had engraved on his coins, and which correspond to the years of his reign. In a later series of Baalshillem II coins, the king emphasized his son's legitimacy as heir by inscribing the first letter of the latter's name on the reverse ("ʿ" for his son Abdashtart) in addition to the abbreviation of his own name on the obverse.

In a passage of the Oxyrhyncus manuscripts, relating the events of the 398 BC battle of Cnidus, the leader of the Sidonian fleet is named in the papyrus Sakton. Sakton was identified with Baalshillem II, who in 398 was in his fourth year of reign. The Greek name Sakton is interpreted as "Shipowner".

Sarcophagus 

Genealogy 
Baalshillem II was a descendant of Baalshillem I's dynasty; his heir was his son Abdashtart I.

See also 

 King of Sidon – A list of the ancient rulers of the city of Sidon

Notes

References

Bibliography 

 
 
 
 
 
 
 
 
 
 
 
 
 
 
 
 
 
 
 
 

5th-century BC rulers in Asia
Kings of Sidon
Rulers in the Achaemenid Empire
5th-century BC Phoenician people